S. laevis  may refer to:
 Scleria laevis, the smooth scleria, a flowering plant species in the genus Scleria
 Serrata laevis, a sea snail species
 Shorea laevis, a plant species found in Indonesia, Malaysia, Myanmar and Thailand
 Sporolactobacillus laevis, an anaerobic Gram-positive bacterium species in the genus Sporolactobacillus
 Stokesia laevis, a flowering plant species native to southeastern North America
 Symphonia laevis, a tropical woody plant species in the genus Symphonia
 Symplecta laevis, a crane fly species in the genus Symplecta

See also
 List of Latin and Greek words commonly used in systematic names#L